The Customs House is a historic government building in Nashville, Tennessee.

History and architecture
It was built from 1876 to 1882 with limestone from Bowling Green, Kentucky. The building was designed by architects and engineers in the Office of the Supervising Architect under William Appleton Potter, with construction beginning in 1876. It was completed by his successor, James G. Hill, and first occupied in April of 1882. A rear wing was added in 1903, which was extended to the east and west in 1916. The building originally housed facilities for the United States Post Office, the United States District Court for the Middle District of Tennessee, the United States Customs Service and other agencies, though several of these would later move to other locations.

It has been listed on the National Register of Historic Places since December 26, 1972 as the Federal Office Building. The building is now privately owned, although it is leased by the United States bankruptcy court for the Middle District of Tennessee.

References

External links

Government buildings on the National Register of Historic Places in Tennessee
Government buildings completed in 1875
Gothic Revival architecture in Tennessee
Buildings and structures in Nashville, Tennessee
1875 establishments in Tennessee